LT PGB is an abbreviation for a family of Chinese built precision guided munitions named Fury Precision-guided munition (Lei-Ting Jing-Que Zhi-Dao Zha-Dan, 雷霆精确制导炸弹) developed by Luoyang Electro-Optics Technology Development Centre (EOTDC), a subsidiary of China Aerospace Science and Technology Corporation (CASC).  Alternatively, LT PGB is also referred by its laser guidance, as Fury laser-guided bomb (Lei-Ting Ji-Guang Zhi-Dao Zha-Dan, 雷霆激光制导炸弹), or LT LGB.

LT PGB is actually an upgrade kit to modernize gravity bombs with precision / laser guidance.  The weapon is often erroneously referred as a possible Chinese copy of Russian KAB-500L, but in reality, the origin of this weaponry was actually developed from American Paveway instead.  Samples of unexploded Paveway I were provided to China by North Vietnam during the Vietnam War, as with the targeting pods from downed American aircraft, and China decided to reverse engineer the American precision guided munition in the late 1970s.  However, due to the Chinese industrial and technological limitations at the time, it would take more than a decade to for the Chinese equivalent of Paveway I to complete.  However, after evaluations in the late 1980s and early 1990s, Chinese military decided that a weapon of Paveway I class was not adequate, and the weapon did not enter mass production.  A more capable version of the Paveway II class was developed, and was judged to be adequate by the Chinese military, and entered mass production.  This model entering mass production was designated as LT-2, where the LT designation had begun, and thus there was no LT-1, according to the EOTDC spokesman.  LT-2 utilizes the exact bang–bang control just like the American Paveway II.

Another member of LT LGB/PGB family, LT-3 made its public debut in the 8th Zhuhai Airshow held in November 2008.  LT-3 is a Paveway III class weaponry, and just like Paveway III, it utilizes a much more sophisticated seeker with a wider field of view and proportional guidance, minimizing the energy loss of course corrections.  Consequently, LT-3 is substantially more costly than LT-2, so the latter also remains in mass production as a cheaper alternative of the former.  LT series upgrade kit can be fitted to a variety of gravity bombs, up to five tons.  Due to the close similarities between LT-2/3 and Paveway II/IIII, some foreign (as well as domestic Chinese) sources have claimed that LT-2/3 are based on unexploded samples of Paveway II/III obtained from countries targeted by US, but such claims have yet to be verified.

A series of targeting pods have been developed for LT LGB/PGB.  The earliest samples are widely publicized in China, in photographs showing it's been carried by Nanchang Q-5.  This early example of targeting pod has a diameter of 0.36 meter and weighs 250 kg, and for alternative targeting, the ground laser designator is used, weighing at 32 kg.  Later models would use advanced microelectronics to reduce the size and weight of all of these targeting systems.  The targeting pod for more advanced LT-3 can also be used for less sophisticated LT-2, but not vice versa.  Alternatively, LT PGB can also be guided by any general purpose targeting pods, such as FILAT.  In comparison to the more complex FILAT, the dedicated laser targeting pods are less costly.  Chinese media have shown photographs of FT PGB being dropped from helicopters such as Chinese Naval Ka-28, in addition to the fixed winged platforms.  However, neither nose-mounted nor mast-mounted targeting turrets have been specially developed for rotary platforms, but instead, the targeting pods for fixed winged platforms are carried directly by Chinese helicopters for targeting.  The range of LT-2 is between 10 and 15 km, and the maximum time during which the bomb is guided is around 20 seconds, and the sensor mounted on LT-2 has a maximum range of 4 km.  Similar information for LT-3 has not been released yet, but it is quoted to be greater than that of LT-2 by the developer at the defense exhibitions.

FT series PGB is also used as a component for a subfamily of another Chinese PGM, LS PGB, a family of gliding precision guided bomb.  LT series LGB/PGB was first revealed to public at the 7th Zhuhai Airshow held in November 2006 with LT-2 model of the family.  All models in the family of this weapon are built to Chinese GJV289A standard, the Chinese equivalent of MIL-STD-1553B.  The adaptation of such military standard means that the weapon can be readily deployed on any western platforms.

Variants
There are several variants in the LT family:
 LT-2: laser guided 500 kg / 1000 lb bombs
 LT-3: laser and satellite guided 500 kg / 1000 lb bombs
 GB-1: 500 kg / 1000 lb bomb with proportional navigation seeker design There are disagreements among this designation with TG series: some claim that GB-1 is the PGB armed with proportional navigation seeker, while some claim that GB-1 is actually the proportional navigation seeker conversion upgrade kit, while the bomb itself is TG series instead.
 TG-100/250/500/1000: At the 9th Zhuhai Airshow held in November 2012, it was revealed that a family of laser-guided bombs (LGB)  utilizing LT PGB upgrade kit was designated as Tian Ge series (or Tiange, 天戈 in Chinese, which is the ancient Chinese name for Boötes).  Produced by the subsidiary of Norinco, the Harbin Jiancheng Group (哈尔滨建成集团有限公司), a total of four models of Boötes series were shown at the airshow, including Boötes-100, Boötes-250, Boötes-500 and Boötes-10000, (TG-100/250/500/1000) named after 100/250/500/1000 kg iron bombs used.  The marketing of Boötes series LGBs suggests that the LT LGB upgrade conversion kit, as well as the bombs armed with such conversion upgrade kits, the Boötes series, are both available for export.  Some of the TG series have suffix ER in their names, such as TG250-ER, with ER being the English abbreviation for Extended Range, because the bomb also utilizes LS PGB kit for gliding, so that it can be launched further away from targets with increased range.

Operator
: People's Liberation Army
People's Liberation Army Air Force
People's Liberation Army Navy Air Force

References

Categories

Weapons of the People's Republic of China
Guided bombs
Military equipment introduced in the 2000s